Eberhard Rösch (born 9 April 1954) is a former East German biathlete.

Rösch finished third overall in the World Cup in the 1977–78 and 1979–80 seasons. He worked for 17 years as a Stasi informer. He is the father of the currently active biathlete Michael Rösch.

Biathlon results
All results are sourced from the International Biathlon Union.

Olympic Games
2 medals (1 silver, 1 bronze)

World Championships
5 medals (3 gold, 1 silver, 1 bronze)

*During Olympic seasons competitions are only held for those events not included in the Olympic program.

Individual victories
1 victory (1 Sp)

*Results are from UIPMB and IBU races which include the Biathlon World Cup, Biathlon World Championships and the Winter Olympic Games.

References

External links
 
 Article about sport by E.R.

1954 births
Living people
German male biathletes
Biathletes at the 1980 Winter Olympics
Olympic biathletes of East Germany
Medalists at the 1980 Winter Olympics
Olympic medalists in biathlon
Olympic bronze medalists for East Germany
Olympic silver medalists for East Germany
Biathlon World Championships medalists
Sportspeople from Chemnitz
Recipients of the Patriotic Order of Merit
Recipients of the Banner of Labor
People of the Stasi
People from Bezirk Karl-Marx-Stadt